Livingston Oates Farm is a historic home and farm located near Clinton, Sampson County, North Carolina.   The house was built about 1875, and is a one-story, double pile, Greek Revival style frame dwelling.  It has a cross gable roof, rear ell, brick pier foundation, and a dominant front, pedimented, central porch. The interior is center-hall in plan. Also on the property are the contributing commissary, center aisle barn and stable, packhouse, an early gas pump, root cellar, tractor shed, and family cemetery.

It was added to the National Register of Historic Places in 1986.

References

Farms on the National Register of Historic Places in North Carolina
Greek Revival houses in North Carolina
Houses completed in 1875
Buildings and structures in Sampson County, North Carolina
National Register of Historic Places in Sampson County, North Carolina